Simmarasi is a 1998 Indian Tamil-language drama film directed and written by Erode Soundar. The film stars Sarathkumar and Khushbu. Kanaka, Manorama, Anandaraj and Vineeth play supporting roles. The film was one among 1998 Deepavali releases and opened in October to positive reviews. It was a huge successful film. Sarathkumar bagged the Tamil Nadu State Film Award for Best Actor. A sub- plot of the movie went on to be used in the Telugu movie Siva Rama Raju and the Kannada movie Paramashiva - both of which were remakes of another Sarathkumar movie Samudhiram.

Plot
A man named Manickavasagam (Sarathkumar) happens to stop a caste fight in a village. The villagers ask him to remain and help with their conflicts, thus inciting the wrath of Maragatham (Anandaraj). Maragatham is the biggest badman in the village, and he even killed his own brother for marrying into a different caste. Lakshmi's (Kanaka) son Kathir (Vineeth) wants to build a factory, which Manickavasagam will not allow. This makes Kathir ally with Maragatham. Finally Manickavasagam kills Maragatham.

Cast

Sarathkumar as Manickavasagam
Khushbu as Sivagami, Manickavasagam's wife
Kanaka as Lakshmi
Manorama as Manickavasagam's mother
Anandaraj as Maragatham
Vineeth as Kathir, Lakshmi's son
Ponnambalam as Police Inspector
Thalaivasal Vijay as Lakshmi's husband
Fathima Babu as Maragatham's wife
Easwari Rao as Rasathi
Manivannan
R. Sundarrajan
Bala Singh
Singamuthu
Thalapathy Dinesh

Production

Kanaka replaced Gautami in the film during July 1998. Nagma had earlier been selected for the role but was left out after her relationship with Sarathkumar ended.

Soundtrack
The film's soundtrack and background score was composed by musician, S. A. Rajkumar.

Reception
A critic from Dinakaran noted that "some of the scenes have come out good. But there is very, very long flash back scenes that among them some of the scenes really don't have that much relevance to the story line". Kala Krishnan-Ramesh of Deccan Herald wrote "Simmarasi deserves a response because its themes, its emotions, its sounds and colours are grander than those we are accustomed to."

References

1998 films
Films scored by S. A. Rajkumar
1990s Tamil-language films
Super Good Films films